Blue Gate Crossing is a 2002 Taiwanese film by writer-director Yee Chin-yen. It was nominated for Best Asian Film at the 23rd Hong Kong Film Awards held in 2004.

Cast
 Chen Bolin as Zhang Shihao 
 Gwei Lun-mei as Meng Kerou 
 Yolin Liang as Lin Yuezhen
 Joanna Chou as Mrs. Meng

Cameo
 Jay Shih as Pipi

Plot

Reception
The film has been well-received critically. Dennis Lim, in a review for the Village Voice, observed the film's "meticulous framing and haunting use of repeated motifs" reflects the influence of Taiwanese New Wave directors Hou Hsiao-hsien and Edward Yang. The Portland Mercury described the film as "a modern-day Chinese lesbo twist on the old Cyrano story" that "treads new territory in the teen coming of age drama realm," praising Yee's "haiku-like directorial lyricism."

Events 

 2002：Cannes Film Festival "Directors' Fortnight"
 2002：Toronto International Film Festival
 2002：Tokyo International Film Festival
 2002：Busan International Film Festival
 2002：Seattle International Film Festival Competition
 2002：Vancouver Film Festival 
 2003：Bangkok Film Festival
 2003：Adelaide Film Festival
 2003：Istanbul International Film Festival
 2003：San Francisco International LGBT Film Festival
 2003：Dublin LGBT Film Festival
 2003：Milwaukee LGBT Film & Video Festival
 2002：Asia Pacific Film Festival
 2004：Belgium Holebi LGBT film festival

References

External links
"A Taipei Love Triangle", TIME
 

2002 films
2002 drama films
2002 LGBT-related films
Lesbian-related films
LGBT-related drama films
2000s Mandarin-language films
Taiwanese LGBT-related films
Taiwanese high school films
Taiwanese teen drama films
Teen LGBT-related films
Films set in Taipei